The following is the list of squads that took place in the men's field hockey tournament at the 1960 Summer Olympics.

Group A

Denmark
The following players represented Denmark:

 Erling Nielsen
 Bent Kilde
 Carsten Bruun
 Erik Frandsen
 Hans Glendrup
 Villy Moll Nielsen
 Jesper Guldbrandsen
 Poul Moll Nielsen
 Flemming Kristiansen
 Torben Alstrup Jensen
 Vagn Peitersen
 Willy Kristoffersen

India
The following players represented India:

 Shankar Singh
 Prithipal Singh
 Jaman Lal Singh
 Leslie Singh
 Charanjit Singh
 Singh Sawant
 Gindi Singh
 V. J. Singh
 Jaswant Singh
 Udham Singh
 Raghbir Singh Bhola
 Joe Singh
 Mohinder Singh

Netherlands
The following players represented the Netherlands:

 Carel Dekker
 Eddie Zwier
 Egbert de Graeff
 Frans Fiolet
 Freddie Hooghiemstra
 Gerard Overdijkink
 Gerrit de Ruiter
 Hans Wagener
 Jaap Leemhuis
 Jan Willem van Erven Dorens
 Jan van Gooswilligen
 Patrick Buteux van der Kamp
 Theo van Vroonhoven
 Theo Terlingen
 Thom van Dijck
 Wim de Beer

New Zealand
The following players represented New Zealand:

 Anthony Hayde
 Bruce Turner
 Guy McGregor
 Ian Kerr
 Jim Barclay
 John Abrams
 John Cullen
 Ross Gillespie
 Kevin Percy
 Mervyn McKinnon
 Murray Mathieson
 Noel Hobson
 Phil Bygrave
 Bill Schaefer

Group B

Australia
The following players represented Australia:

 Barry Malcolm
 Desmond Spackman
 Donald Currie
 Eric Pearce
 Errol Bill
 Gordon Pearce
 Graham Wood
 John McBryde
 Julian Pearce
 Kevin Carton
 Louis Hailey
 Mervyn Crossman
 Mike Craig
 Philip Pritchard
 Ray Evans

Japan
The following players represented Japan:

 Hiroyuki Fujiwara
 Hisatoshi Yamazaki
 Ichiro Sado
 Kenji Iijima
 Michinori Watada
 Tadatoshi Abe
 Teruo Yaguchi
 Toshiharu Nakamura
 Tsuneya Yuzaki
 Hiroshi Kojima
 Yoshio Kojima
 Masaru Kanbe
 Kunio Iwahashi
 Seiji Kihara

Pakistan
The following players represented Pakistan:

 Ahmed Hussain Atif
 Ghulam Ahmed
 Anwar Ahmed Khan
 Noor Ahmed
 Abdul Ahmed
 Habib Ahmed Kiddie
 Ahmed Naseer Bunda
 Motiullah Ahmed
 Abdul Ahmed
 Bashir Ahmed
 Abdul Waheed Ahmed
 Mushtaq Ahmed
 Khurshid Ahmed

Poland
The following players represented Poland:

 Alfons Flinik
 Czesław Kubiak
 Henryk Flinik
 Jan Flinik
 Jan Górny
 Kazimierz Dąbrowski
 Leon Wiśniewski
 Narcyz Maciaszczyk
 Roman Micał
 Ryszard Marzec
 Władysław Śmigielski
 Włodzimierz Różański
 Zdzisław Wojdylak

Group C

France
The following players represented France:

 Albert Vanpoulle
 Claude Dugardin
 Claude Leroy
 Claude Windal
 Diran Manoukian
 Gérard Poulain
 Ido Marang
 Jacques Bonnet
 Jacques Mauchien
 Jean Desmasures
 Jean-Pierre Windal
 Maurice Dobigny
 Philippe Reynaud
 Pierre Court
 Roger Bignon
 Yvan Bia

Italy
The following players represented Italy:

 Alessandro Vannini
 Antonio Lenza
 Antonio Vargiu
 Bruno Figliola
 Claudio Candotti
 Claudio Libotte
 Enrico Bisio
 Felice Salis
 Giampaolo Farci
 Giampaolo Medda
 Giovanni Anni
 Giovanni Mazzalupi
 Luciano Soli
 Luigi Farci
 Quarto Pianesi
 Sergio Ballesio
 Tullio Marchiori
 Ugo Zorco

Kenya
The following players represented Kenya:

 Saude George
 Anthony Vaz
 Avtar Singh Sohal
 Jagnandan Singh
 Surjeet Singh Deol
 Silvester Fernandes
 Edgar Fernandes
 Hilary Fernandes
 Surjeet Singh Panesar
 Pritam Singh Sandhu
 Alu Mendonca
 John Simonian
 Kirpal Singh Bhardwaj
 Gursaran Singh Sehmi
 Egbert Fernandes
 Krishnan Kumar Aggarwal

United Team of Germany
The following players represented the United Team of Germany:

 Carsten Keller
 Christian Büchting
 Dieter Krause
 Eberhard Ferstl
 Günther Ullerich
 Helmut Nonn
 Herbert Winters
 Hugo Budinger
 Klaus Greinert
 Klaus Woeller
 Norbert Schuler
 Werner Delmes
 Willi Brendel
 Wolfgang End

Group D

Belgium
The following players represented Belgium:

 André Carbonnelle
 André Muschs
 Eddy Carbonnelle
 Franz Lorette
 Freddy Rens
 Guy Debbaudt
 Guy Huyghens
 Jacques Rémy
 Jacques Vanderstappen
 Jean Dubois
 Jean-Pierre Marionex
 Jean-Louis Roersch
 Michel Muschs
 Pierre Delbecque
 Robert Lycke
 Roger Goossens
 Yves Bernaert

Great Britain
The following players represented Great Britain:

 Patrick Austen
 John Bell
 Harry Cahill
 Denys Carnill
 Peter Croft
 Howard Davis
 John Hindle
 Charles Jones
 Neil Livingstone
 Stuart Mayes
 Derek Miller
 John Neill
 Chris Saunders-Griffiths
 Frederick Scott
 Ian Taylor

Spain
The following players represented Spain:

 Pedro Amat
 Francisco Caballer
 Juan Ángel Calzado
 José Colomer
 Carlos del Coso
 José Antonio Dinarés
 Eduardo Dualde
 Joaquín Dualde
 Rafael Egusquiza
 Ignacio Macaya
 Pedro Murúa
 Pedro Roig
 Luis María Usoz
 Narciso Ventalló

Switzerland
The following players represented Switzerland:

 Albert Piaget
 Georges Mathys
 Gilbert Recordon
 Hans Straub
 Heinz Wirz
 Jean Giubbini
 Jean Glarner
 Kurt Locher
 Kurt von Arx
 René Wiedmer
 Roger Zanetti
 Roland Zaninetti
 Walther Arber
 Walther Wirz
 Werner Hausmann
 Werner Schmid

References

1960

Squads